Poitiers station (French: Gare de Poitiers) is a major railway station in the French city of Poitiers, in the department of Vienne and region of Nouvelle-Aquitaine. The station is situated on the Paris–Bordeaux railway. It was built in the 1850s.

Services 
A wide array of rail services serve Poitiers, including TGV Atlantique services from Paris Montparnasse to Bordeaux. Other rail services operate under the Transport express régional (TER) brand, and run from Poitiers to Angoulême, Tours, Limoges, Niort and La Rochelle. The station is also served by a TER bus service to Parthenay and Nantes.

See also 

 List of SNCF stations in Nouvelle-Aquitaine

References

Railway stations in Vienne
Buildings and structures in Poitiers
Railway stations in France opened in 1851